The following article lists stadiums used presently or in the past for rugby union in Australia.

Overview
While these stadiums are occasionally used by rugby union, none except Ballymore could be described as "rugby union grounds" per se. All are used principally for rugby league and/or Australian rules football. Several of these stadiums, primarily those with rectangular fields, are also used for soccer.

Stadiums used by the defunct Australian Rugby Championship and the 2003 Rugby World Cup are included for posterity.

Present Grounds

Former Grounds
These grounds have been used in the past, but don't host club or international fixtures (used less frequently than once a year).

Super Rugby Stadiums

National Rugby Championship Stadiums
Home match venues for the 2014 NRC season:

Home match venues for the 2015 NRC season:

See also

List of rugby union stadiums by capacity
List of English rugby union stadiums by capacity
List of Super Rugby stadiums
List of rugby union stadiums in France
List of Australian Football League grounds
List of Australian cricket grounds
List of ice rinks in Australia
List of indoor arenas in Australia
List of National Basketball League (Australia) venues
List of Australian rugby league stadiums
List of soccer stadiums in Australia
List of Oceanian stadiums by capacity

References

External links
 Austadiums.com
 Rugby Stadiums

Australia
Rugby union stadiums by capacity
Stadiums by capacity
Lists of sports venues with capacity